Lim Keng Liat (born 29 August 1980) is a retired Malaysian swimmer. He was born in Sandakan, Sabah. He was awarded the National Sportsman of the Year and Olympian of the Year in 1998. In 2009, he was inducted into the Olympic Council of Malaysia (OCM) Hall of Fame.

Career
Lim attended The Bolles School in Jacksonville for his prep tenure and had unparalleled success. In 1998, 1999, and 2000, Lim was the national high school champion in both the 100 butterfly and 100 backstroke, and he twice set the 100 backstroke national record during his time with the Bulldogs.

Alex Lim first appeared in Southeast Asia Games at the age of 15 in 1995. At the 1998 Asian Games, he won Malaysia's first swimming gold medal in 100m backstroke as well as breaking the games record. He was the only Malaysian swimmer to date who clinched a swimming medal in Commonwealth Games. At the 2002 Commonwealth Games, he won the silver medal in 50m backstroke where his time was just 0.02 seconds behind the former Australian world champion, Matt Welsh. He also won the bronze medal in 100m backstroke.
   
He qualified for the 1996 Summer Olympics, 2000 Summer Olympics, and 2004 Summer Olympics. In the 2004 Summer Olympics, he became the first and only Malaysian to qualify for the semi-finals in swimming at Olympics. He was also the first and only Malaysian to enter the final in the 100m backstroke at the FINA World Swimming Championships Barcelona, Spain.

Awards 
 1998 Malaysian Sportman of the Year
 1998 Malaysian Olympian of the Year
 OCM Hall of Fame

Honour

Honour of Malaysia
  : 
 Member of the Order of the Defender of the Realm (A.M.N.) (2000)

See also
 List of Commonwealth Games medallists in swimming (men)

References 

1980 births
Living people
People from Sandakan
Malaysian male swimmers
Male backstroke swimmers
Olympic swimmers of Malaysia
Swimmers at the 1996 Summer Olympics
Swimmers at the 2000 Summer Olympics
Swimmers at the 2004 Summer Olympics
Commonwealth Games silver medallists for Malaysia
Commonwealth Games bronze medallists for Malaysia
Swimmers at the 1998 Commonwealth Games
Swimmers at the 2002 Commonwealth Games
Swimmers at the 2006 Commonwealth Games
Asian Games medalists in swimming
Swimmers at the 1998 Asian Games
Swimmers at the 2002 Asian Games
Swimmers at the 2006 Asian Games
Asian Games gold medalists for Malaysia
Asian Games silver medalists for Malaysia
Commonwealth Games medallists in swimming
Medalists at the 1998 Asian Games
Medalists at the 2002 Asian Games
Southeast Asian Games medalists in swimming
Southeast Asian Games gold medalists for Malaysia
Southeast Asian Games silver medalists for Malaysia
Members of the Order of the Defender of the Realm
Competitors at the 1995 Southeast Asian Games
20th-century Malaysian people
21st-century Malaysian people
Medallists at the 2002 Commonwealth Games